Build Back Better World (B3W) is an initiative undertaken by the G7. Launched on June 12, 2021, it would provide an alternative to China's Belt and Road Initiative (BRI) for infrastructure development of low- and middle-income countries.

The initiative seeks to address the $40 trillion worth of infrastructure needed by developing countries by 2035. The initiative aims to catalyze funding for quality infrastructure from the private sector and will encourage private-sector investments that support "climate, health and health security, digital technology, and gender equity and equality". The initiative builds on the Blue Dot Network, a co-opted collaboration that aims to build a global network through lending-based financing to build roads, bridges, airports, ports, power plants.

Standards and principles

The B3W efforts are in line with the standards and principles of the Blue Dot Network (BDN), relating to the environment and climate, labor and social safeguards, financing, construction, anticorruption, and other areas. On November 4, 2019, U.S. Under Secretary of State Keith Krach formally launched the BDN with his Australian and Japanese counterparts with access to US$60 billion of capital from the U.S. International Development Finance Corporation (DFC) at the Indo-Pacific Business Forum in Bangkok.

Krach announced the BDN's global trust standards, which are based on "respect for transparency and accountability, sovereignty of property and resources, local labor and human rights, rule of law, the environment, and sound government practices in procurement and financing." Under Secretary Krach committed $2 million (USD) of U.S. State Department seed money for the steering committee and issued an invitation to other G7 members to join. On October 19, 2020, on behalf of the twelve Three Seas nations, President Kersti Kaljulaid endorsed the BDN and the Three Seas Summit in Tallinn, Estonia. 

On June 7, 2021, the Organisation for Economic Co-operation and Development (OECD) committed to support the BDN at the meeting of the latter's executive consultation group in Paris, France. On June 16, Krach was awarded the Westernization Award by StrategEast for his work as under secretary of state in the country of Georgia for leading the Clean Network and Clean Infrastructure initiatives, which provide an alternative to the "One Belt One Road" for the countries of Eurasia and is supported by all G7 countries as the "Build Back a Better World".

See also
 New Silk Road Initiative
 The Clean Network
Equator Principles
Partnership for Global Infrastructure and Investment

References

G7 summits
Presidency of Joe Biden